Breaking Point is a 2012 album by alternative metal band Digital Summer. All songs on Breaking Point were written and co-produced by Digital Summer.  The album was recorded and mixed at VuDu Studios in Port Jefferson, NY, with highly acclaimed producers Mike Watts and Steve Haigler. Assistant audio engineering duties were performed by Tom Flynn and Tom Happle of VuDu Studios. All tracks were mastered by Mike Bozzi at Bernie Grundman Mastering in Hollywood, CA.

The first single, "Forget You," features a performance by Clint Lowery of Sevendust on lead guitar. The single hit active rock radio stations across the country in July 2012.

The other two singles off of this album were "Breaking Point" and "Dance in the Fire."

Track list

References

2012 albums
Digital Summer albums